Luigi Piotti (October 27, 1913 in Milan – April 19, 1971 in Godiasco) was a racing driver from Italy. He participated in nine Formula One World Championship Grands Prix, debuting on January 22, 1956. He scored no championship points.

Complete Formula One World Championship results
(key)

References

1913 births
1971 deaths
Italian Formula One drivers
Arzani-Volpini Formula One drivers
Maserati Formula One drivers
OSCA Formula One drivers
Racing drivers from Milan
World Sportscar Championship drivers